Aristaea amalopa is a moth of the family Gracillariidae. It is known from Western Australia.

References

Aristaea
Moths described in 1907